The Ambassador of Malaysia to the People's Republic of China is the head of Malaysia's diplomatic mission to China. The position has the rank and status of an Ambassador Extraordinary and Plenipotentiary and is based in the Embassy of Malaysia, Beijing.

List of heads of mission

Ambassadors to China

See also
 China–Malaysia relations

References 

 
China
Malaysia